Fighter aces in World War II had tremendously varying kill scores, affected as they were by many factors: the pilot's skill level, the performance of the airplane the pilot flew and the planes they flew against, how long they served, their opportunity to meet the enemy in the air (Allied to Axis disproportion), whether they were the formation's leader or a wingman, the standards their air service brought to the awarding of victory credits, et cetera.

Towards the end of the war, the Axis powers had largely exhausted their supply of skilled pilots and the replacements did not have as much opportunity to gain enough experience to be successful. Additionally, national policies differed; German, Italian, and Japanese pilots tended to return to the cockpit over and over again until they were killed.

It is not clear what impact each nation's rules for score crediting have on the counts listed below. Germans credited a shared victory to only one pilot, while the French credited full victory to all participants. British, Finnish and US air forces credited fractional shares of aerial victories, resulting in fractions, such as 11½, which might be for example 10 aircraft and three shares with the second pilot. Some U.S. commands also credited aircraft destroyed on the ground. The Soviets counted only solo kills, while group kills were counted separately, as did the Japanese. The Italian Air Force did not officially credit victories to individual pilots, but to their unit as a whole. Probable kills are usually left out of the list.

It is necessary to emphasize that the question of assessing and comparing the success rate of fighters by number of victories is one of the more problematic. There are disputes about what is "shot down" and what is "air victory", but the most problematic seems to be credibility of reports and reliability of its confirmation, which was substantially different in particular air forces. The most reliable is considered the confirmation of the victories in RAF, which based its counts on comparison of testimonials of participants andif possiblefilm material.

Aces

Gallery

Aces

Notes

References

Citations

Bibliography

 
 
 Hata, Ikuhiko with Yasuho Izawa and Christopher Shores. Japanese Army Air Force Fighter Units and Their Aces, 1931–1945. London: Grub Street, 2002. .
 
 Massimello, Giovanni and Giorgio Apostolo. Italian Aces of World War 2. Osprey Publishing Ltd, 2000. .
 
 

 
 
 Rajlich, Jiří. Esa na obloze . Praha: Naše vojsko, 1995. .
 
 Sakaida, Henry. Japanese Army Air Force Aces, 1937–45. Botley, Oxfordshire, UK: Osprey Publishing, 1997. .
 Seidl, Hans D. Stalin's Eagles: An Illustrated Study of the Soviet Aces of World War II and Korea. Atglen, PA: Schiffer Publishing, 1998. .
 
 
 
 

 
 Becze, Csaba (2016). Elfelejtett hősök: a Magyar Királyi Honvéd Légierők ászai a második világháborúban . Zrinyi Kiadó. Second, extended edition. . .
 
 

 

de:Liste deutscher Jagdflieger im Zweiten Weltkrieg